The Newcastle Jets 2011-12 season was the Newcastle Jets' seventh season since the inception of the Australian A-League and the eleventh since the club's founding, in 2000.

2011-12 squad

Senior squad

Transfers

In

Out

Youth squad

References 

Newcastle Jets FC seasons
Newcastle